St. Marks River State Park which opened in 2007, is the 161st Florida State Park, located about 10 miles east of Tallahassee, south of U.S. Highway 27. The park's 2,589 acres occupy parts of Jefferson and Leon counties and act as a buffer from development for the St. Marks River.

References

External links
 St. Marks River Preserve State Park at Florida State Parks
St. Marks River State Park
St. Marks River State Park

Parks in Leon County, Florida
Parks in Jefferson County, Florida
State parks of Florida
Protected areas established in 2007
2007 establishments in Florida